Melvyn Millington was an English professional footballer who played as a centre back for Frickley, Rotherham United and Torquay United. Millington started his career at Frickley in the Midland League, before transferring to Rotherham United for the 1933-1934 season, making two appearances, before successfully completing a trial at Torquay United with former Frickley teammate Albert Clarke in 1934. Millington left Torquay after the 1934-1935 season.

References

 http://www.frickleyathleticmuseum/albert-clarke
 https://web.archive.org/web/20141107204908/http://www.rotherhamunited1925.co.uk/#/playersm/4546324635

English footballers
Association football forwards
Frickley Athletic F.C. players
Torquay United F.C. players
Rotherham United F.C. players
English Football League players
Place of birth missing
Year of death missing
Place of death missing
1911 births